Swift County is a county in the U.S. state of Minnesota. As of the 2020 census, the population was 9,838. Its county seat is Benson.

History
It was established on February 18, 1870, and named for Henry Adoniram Swift, the third governor of Minnesota (1863–64).

The Indians had grievances against the government, including delays in sending annuities that caused near starvation several times. In August 1862, an Indian rebellion broke out in Minnesota. The warfare reached the settlements just getting started in northeastern Swift County. By late September 1862, the Indian War was almost over but the settlers hesitated to venture back to Swift County until 1865, when all danger was apparently over. Scandinavians and Germans were in decided majority among the early settlers. A number of them came with the honor and privileges of Civil War veterans.

In 1869, the St. Paul & Pacific Railroad reached Willmar, and the next year it arrived in Benson. The Swift County Courthouse was built in 1897 and was listed on the National Register of Historic Places in 1976. Benson is the county seat. Railroad tracks run through Benson's downtown business district with parks on each side.

Historic buildings
Historic buildings in Swift County include:
 Gethsemane Episcopal Church in Appleton built in 1879 and listed on the National Register of Historic Places in 2011.

Politics
Swift County was traditionally a Democratic stronghold, with the last Republican to win it before 2016 being Dwight D. Eisenhower in 1952. In 2016, a dramatic swing against the Democrats in the Rust Belt saw Swift County shifting a massive 36% toward the Republican Party, with Donald Trump winning it over Hillary Clinton by 26%.

Geography
The Minnesota River flows southeast along the county's lower western border. The Pomme de Terre River flows south-southwest through the county's western part, discharging into the Minnesota. The Chippewa River flows south-southwest through the county's central part, discharging into the Minnesota south of the county. The county's terrain consists of rolling hills, largely devoted to agriculture. It slopes to south and the west, with its highest point near its northeast corner at 1,240' (378m) ASL.

Swift County is primarily agricultural, but also hosts agriculture equipment manufacturers and an ethanol plant. It has 24 lakes and nine rivers and streams. Caltopo shows the true highpoint to be 1300 ft in elevation about 1/3 of a mile southwest of the Monson State Wildlife Management Area:latitude 45.3046&longitude=-95.3031

Major highways

  U.S. Highway 12
  U.S. Highway 59
  Minnesota State Highway 7
  Minnesota State Highway 9
  Minnesota State Highway 29
  Minnesota State Highway 104
  Minnesota State Highway 119

Adjacent counties

 Stevens County - northwest
 Pope County - northeast
 Kandiyohi County - east
 Chippewa County - south
 Lac qui Parle County - southwest
 Big Stone County - west

Airport
Appleton Municipal Airport provides general aviation service for Swift County.

Protected areas

 Bench State Wildlife Management Area
 Camp Kerk State Wildlife Management Area
 Danvers State Wildlife Management Area
 Ehrenburg State Wildlife Management Area
 Hayes-Myhre State Wildlife Management Area
 Henry X State Wildlife Management Area
 Hollerberg Lake State Wildlife Management Area
 Monson Lake State Park

Demographics

2000 census
As of the 2000 census, there were 11,956 people, 4,353 households, and 2,881 families in the county. The population density was 16.1/sqmi (6.22/km2). There were 4,821 housing units at an average density of 6.50/sqmi (2.51/km2). The racial makeup of the county was 90.67% White, 2.69% Black or African American, 0.50% Native American, 1.43% Asian, 1.52% Pacific Islander, 1.40% from other races, and 1.79% from two or more races.  2.68% of the population were Hispanic or Latino of any race. Swift County has the highest percentage of Pacific Islander natives out of any U.S. county outside Hawaii. 34.4% were of German, 30.5% Norwegian, 5.2% Swedish and 5.1% Irish ancestry.

There were 4,353 households, out of which 30.00% had children under the age of 18 living with them, 56.90% were married couples living together, 6.10% had a female householder with no husband present, and 33.80% were non-families. 30.90% of all households were made up of individuals, and 17.60% had someone living alone who was 65 years of age or older.  The average household size was 2.39 and the average family size was 3.00.

The county population contained 23.00% under the age of 18, 7.30% from 18 to 24, 29.60% from 25 to 44, 21.60% from 45 to 64, and 18.50% who were 65 years of age or older. The median age was 39 years. For every 100 females there were 120.60 males. For every 100 females age 18 and over, there were 124.60 males.

The median income for a household in the county was $34,820, and the median income for a family was $44,208. Males had a median income of $29,362 versus $21,667 for females. The per capita income for the county was $16,360.  About 5.30% of families and 8.40% of the population were below the poverty line, including 6.90% of those under age 18 and 13.80% of those age 65 or over.

2020 Census

Communities

Cities

 Appleton
 Benson (county seat)
 Clontarf
 Danvers
 De Graff
 Holloway
 Kerkhoven
 Murdock

Unincorporated communities
 Fairfield
 Swift Falls

Townships

 Appleton Township
 Benson Township
 Camp Lake Township
 Cashel Township
 Clontarf Township
 Dublin Township
 Edison Township
 Fairfield Township
 Hayes Township
 Hegbert Township
 Kerkhoven Township
 Kildare Township
 Marysland Township
 Moyer Township
 Pillsbury Township
 Shible Township
 Six Mile Grove Township
 Swenoda Township
 Tara Township
 Torning Township
 West Bank Township

See also
 National Register of Historic Places listings in Swift County, Minnesota

References

External links
 Swift County official website
 Swift County Monitor website

 
Minnesota counties
1870 establishments in Minnesota
Populated places established in 1870